Little War Island or Malo ratno ostrvo (Serbian Cyrillic: Мало ратно острво) or Horse Island or Konjsko ostrvo (Serbian Cyrillic: Коњско острво) is a river island (ada) in Serbia, located at the mouth of the Sava river into the Danube. It is part of the Belgrade City proper, the capital of Serbia, and belongs to the municipality of Zemun.

Location 

Characteristics 

The island used to be significantly larger before the World War II. When construction of Novi Beograd began in 1948, the sand from the island was transported to the mainland by large conveyor belts and used for covering the swamp on which the new city was to be built. In the process, the island shrank, and sometimes it is poetically said today that "Novi Beograd is a city on the island".

The island is completely covered by vegetation (poplar trees) and inaccessible for visitors, but can be nicely observed from the barges-restaurants on the Danube's bank.

History 

The island was previously called Konjsko ostrvo, "horse island". Origin of the name can't be confirmed by any specific source, but the island was used as a pasture for the livestock grazing. Also, when travelling to the other side of the river for trade or supplies, the Prečani were leaving their horses on the island.

References 

Uninhabited islands of Serbia
Neighborhoods of Belgrade
Islands of the Danube
River islands of Serbia